Bent man, bent men, Bentman, Bentmen, or variation, may refer to:

 The funny man, as opposed to the straight man, in a comedy duo
 Homosexual man, one who is not "straight"
 Drunkard, a man who is drunk
 Substance intoxication, a man who is high
 An immoral man, particularly lying and criminality, see immorality

See also
 Bent (disambiguation)
 Man (disambiguation)
 Men (disambiguation)